Abdulsalam Jumaa Al Junaibi (born 23 May 1977) is an Emirati former footballer who is a midfielder for Al Dhafra. He is a member of the United Arab Emirates national football team.

See also
 List of men's footballers with 100 or more international caps

References

External links
FIFA
Abdul Salam Al-Jubaibi Jumaa - Century of International Appearances on RSSSF's site
National-Football-Teams profile

1979 births
Living people
Emirati footballers
Al Wahda FC players
Al Jazira Club players
Al Dhafra FC players
2004 AFC Asian Cup players
FIFA Century Club
UAE Pro League players
United Arab Emirates international footballers
Association football midfielders
Footballers at the 1998 Asian Games
Asian Games competitors for the United Arab Emirates